= Lee Joong-seo =

South Korean footballer

Personal information
- Full name: Lee Joong-seo
- Date of birth: 9 June 1995 (age 31)
- Place of birth: South Korea
- Position: Forward

Team information
- Current team: Gwangju FC
- Number: 19

Senior career*
Years	Team	Apps	(Gls)
2017–	Gwangju FC	8	(0)
- * Club domestic league appearances and goals as of 1 January 2018

Lee Joong-seo (born 9 June 1995) is a South Korean footballer who plays for Gwangju FC.
